Vren of Tashir ruled Tashir in the fifth century. The History of Vardan by Yeghishe Vardapet  records him as having led a contingent to the battle of Avarayr in 451.  

5th century in Armenia
5th-century Armenian people
5th-century rulers in Asia
5th-century rulers in Europe